"Sweet Soul Music" is a soul song, first released by Arthur Conley in 1967.

Sweet Soul Music may also refer to:

 Sweet Soul Music (Aaradhna album), 2008
 Sweet Soul Music (London Boys album), 1991
 "Sweet Soul Music" (London Boys song), the title track